"Sometimes I Cry" is a song by American singer Eric Benét, released as the lead single from his fifth album Lost in Time. The song peaked at number 16 on the Billboard Hot R&B/Hip-Hop Songs chart. Benét earned a 2012 Grammy nomination for Best Traditional R&B Performance on this song.

Charts

Weekly charts

Year-end charts

References 

2010 singles
2010 songs
Reprise Records singles
Contemporary R&B ballads
2010s ballads